Moscone may refer to:

 George Moscone (1929–1978), 37th Mayor of San Francisco, California, 1976–1978
 Moscone–Milk assassinations, the murders that killed the Mayor and City Supervisor Harvey Milk
 Moscone Center, a convention center in San Francisco's South of Market district, named for the Mayor
 Moscone Recreation Center, a park in San Francisco's Marina district, also named for the Mayor
 Jonathan Moscone (born 1964), American theater director

See also
 Yerba Buena/Moscone Station, an underground light rail station of the San Francisco Municipal Railway's Muni Metro system
 
 Gianni Moscon (born 1994), Italian professional road racing cyclist
 Mosconi (disambiguation)
 Marconi (disambiguation), sometimes confused with Moscone due to its appearance (a reference to Guglielmo Marconi) in Jefferson Starship's 1985 #1 hit song about San Francisco, "We Built This City"